Riley Township, Ohio may refer to:

Riley Township, Putnam County, Ohio
Riley Township, Sandusky County, Ohio

Ohio township disambiguation pages